WBYN may refer to:

 WBYN-FM, a radio station (107.5 FM) licensed to serve Boyertown, Pennsylvania, United States
 WBYN (AM), a defunct radio station (1160 AM) formerly licensed to serve Lehighton, Pennsylvania